The Military Cross of Merit (Polish: Wojskowy Krzyż Zasługi), Navy Cross of Merit (Morski Krzyż Zasługi), Air Force Cross of Merit (Lotniczy Krzyż Zasługi) are military decorations awarded to members of the Polish Armed Forces. The crosses with swords (z Mieczami) are conferred for meritorious service in combat operations against acts of terrorism at home or during military, peacekeeping or stabilization missions overseas; the crosses without swords are conferred for outstanding non-combat meritorious achievement or service.

History
The crosses were established by the Law of 14 June 2007, which amended the Act of 16 October 1992, concerning medals and decorations.  This law saw the creation of the crosses along with the Military Cross and the Medal for Long Service. The change was implemented on October 9, 2007. In the order of precedence of Polish medals it ranks between the Bronze Cross of Merit and the Medal for Sacrifice and Courage.

Eligibility
The crosses are presented by the President of Poland, on his own initiative or at the request of the Minister of Defence. The president also has the right to revoke the award. The crosses with swords are to be awarded no later than three years after the end of combat operations. Each of the crosses may be awarded twice to any single person, the second award being denoted by a bar on the ribbon and ribbon bar. A particular cross may be awarded to members of the service it represents, however in exceptional cases it can be conferred to members of the other services as well. Civilians and members of non-military uniformed services are not eligible.

Design
The design of the crosses is patterned on that of the Order of the Military Cross. It is a massive Greek cross, in bronze for the Military Cross of Merit, in silver for the two other crosses. The center of the crosses is as follows:
 Military Cross of Merit: an eagle sitting on a sword; 
 Navy Cross of Merit: an armed hand (the symbol of the Polish Navy);
 Air Force Cross of Merit: the Polish Air Force checkerboard.
The reverse looks the same for all three crosses and is inscribed "POLSKA SWEMU OBROŃCY" (Poland to her defender) with two laurel twigs on the sides.

References

External links

See also
 Order of the Military Cross
 Military Cross

Orders, decorations, and medals of Poland
Military awards and decorations of Poland